This is a list of genera in the leaf beetle subfamily Eumolpinae:

A

 Abiromorphus Pic, 1924
 Abirus Chapuis, 1874
 Acanthixus Lefèvre, 1876
 †Acolaspoides Moseyko, Kirejtshuk & Nel, 2010
 Acronymolpus Samuelson, 2015
 Acrothinium Marshall, 1865
 Adorea Lefèvre, 1877
 Aemnestus Jacoby, 1908
 Afroeurydemus Selman, 1965
 Agbalus Chapuis, 1874
 Agetinella Jacoby, 1908
 Agetinus Lefèvre, 1885
 Agrianes Chapuis, 1874
 Agrosterna Harold, 1875
 Ajubus Aslam, 1968
 Alethaxius Lefèvre, 1885
 Alittus Chapuis, 1874
 Allocolaspis Bechyné, 1950
 Aloria Bryant, 1939
 Alwiunia Bechyné, 1953
 Amblynetes Weise, 1904
 Ambodiriana Bechyné, 1953
 Ambohitsitondrona Bechyné, 1964
 Anachalcoplacis B. Bechyné, 1983
 Anchieta Bechyné, 1954
 Andosia Weise, 1896
 Andrahomana Bechyné, 1956
 Androyinus Bechyné, 1964
 Anidania Reitter, 1889
 Antitypona Weise, 1921
 Aoria Baly, 1863
 †Aoriopsis Moseyko, Kirejtshuk & Nel, 2010
 Aphilenia Weise in Reitter, 1889
 Apolepis Baly, 1863
 Apterodina Bechyné, 1954
 Argoa Lefèvre, 1885
 Aristonoda Bechyné, 1953
 Arnobiopsis Jacoby, 1896
 Arsoa Fairmaire, 1901
 Atomyria Jacobson, 1894
 Atrichatus Sharp, 1886
 Aulacia Baly, 1867
 Aulacolepis Baly, 1863
 Aulexis Baly, 1863
 Auranius Jacoby, 1881
 Australotymnes Flowers, 2009

B

 Badenis Weise, 1909
 Balya Jacoby, 1882
 Basilepta Baly, 1860
 Bastrhembus Bechyné, 1947
 Bathseba Motschulsky, 1866
 Bechyneia Jolivet, 1950
 Bedelia Lefèvre, 1875
 Beltia Jacoby, 1881
 Berliozita Bechyné, 1957
 Brachymolpus Fairmaire, 1902
 Brachypnoea Gistel, 1848
 Brachypterodina Flowers, 2004
 Brevicolaspis Laporte, 1833
 Bromius Chevrolat in Dejean, 1836

C

 Callicolaspis Bechyné, 1950
 Callipta Lefèvre, 1885
 Callisina Baly, 1860
 Caryonoda Bechyné, 1951
 Casmena Chapuis, 1874
 Caspiana Lopatin, 1978
 Caudatomolpus Bechyné, 1953
 Cayetunya Bechyné, 1958
 Cazeresia Jolivet, Verma & Mille, 2005
 Cellomius Lefèvre, 1888
 Chalcolema Jacoby, 1890
 Chalcophana Chevrolat in Dejean, 1836
 Chalcophyma Baly, 1865
 Chalcoplacis Chevrolat in Dejean, 1836
 Chalcosicya Blake, 1930
 Cheiridea Baly, 1878
 Cheiridella Jacoby, 1904
 Chiridisia Jacoby, 1898
 Chloropterus Morawitz, 1861
 Chrysochares Morawitz, 1861
 Chrysochus Chevrolat in Dejean, 1836
 Chrysodinopsis Bechyné, 1950
 Chrysolampra Baly, 1859
 Chrysonopa Jacoby, 1908
 Chrysopida Baly, 1861
 Cleoparida Gressitt, 1967
 Cleoporus Lefèvre, 1884
 Cleorina Lefèvre, 1885
 Cleptor Lefèvre, 1885
 Clisithera Baly, 1864
 Clypeolaria Lefèvre, 1885
 Cocotteumolpus Bechyné, 1957
 Colasita Bechyné, 1964
 Colaspedusa Medvedev, 1998
 Colaspibasa Medvedev, 1995
 Colaspidea Laporte, 1833
 Colaspina Weise, 1893
 Colaspinella Weise, 1893
 Colaspis Fabricius, 1801
 Colaspoides Laporte, 1833
 Colasposoma Laporte, 1833
 Coniomma Weise, 1922
 Corumbaea Bechyné, 1954
 Corysthea Baly, 1865
 Costalimaita Bechyné, 1954
 Coytiera Lefèvre, 1875
 Crowsonia Monrós, 1952
 Cryocolaspis Flowers, 2004
 Cubispa Barber, 1946
 Cudnellia Blackburn, 1890
 Cylindromela Weise, 1916
 Cyno Marshall, 1865

D

 Damasus Chapuis, 1874
 Damelia Clark, 1864
 Dematochroma Baly, 1864
 Dematotrichus Gómez-Zurita, 2022
 Demotina Baly, 1863
 Deretrichia Weise, 1913
 Dermestops Jacobson, 1898
 Dermorhytis Baly, 1861
 Dermoxanthus Baly, 1859
 Deuteragbalus Bechyné, 1949
 Deuteronoda Bechyné, 1951
 Deuterotrichia Bechyné, 1957
 Diacolaspis Bechyné, 1950
 Dicolectes Lefèvre, 1886
 Diconerissus Burgeon, 1941
 Dictyneis Baly, 1865
 Didalsus Fairmaire, 1887
 Diplasiaca Weise, 1923
 Dispardentium Sublett & Cook, 2021
 Dolichenus Lefèvre, 1885
 Dorysternoides Bechyné & Bechyné, 1967
 Drakhshandus Aslam, 1968
 Dryadomolpus Bechyné & Bechyné, 1969
 Dumbea Jolivet, Verma & Mille, 2007
 Durangoita Bechyné, 1958

E

 Eboo Reid, 1993
 Echtrusia Lefèvre, 1890
 Edistus Lefèvre, 1884
 Edusella Chapuis, 1874
 Edusoides Blackburn, 1889
 Eka Maulik, 1931
 Endocephalus Chevrolat in Dejean, 1836
 Endoschyrus Jacoby, 1901
 Endroedymolpus Zoia, 2001
 Enneaoria Tan, 1981
 Ennodius Lefèvre, 1885
 Entomochirus Lefèvre, 1884
 Entreriosa Bechyné, 1953
 †Eocenocolaspis Bukejs, Moseyko & Alekseev, 2022
 †Eoeumolpinus Haupt, 1950
 Ephyraea Lefèvre, 1889
 Epinodostoma Bryant & Gressitt, 1957
 Epiphyma Baly, 1860
 Epistamena Weise, 1915
 Eprius Fairmaire, 1902
 Erotenia Lefèvre, 1884
 Erythraella Zoia, 2012
 Eryxia Baly, 1865
 Eucampylochira Bechyné, 1951
 Eucolaspinus Lea, 1916
 Eucolaspis Sharp, 1886
 Eulepton Riley, 2019
 Eulychius Jacoby, 1882
 †Eumolpites Heer, 1865
 Eumolpopsis Jacoby, 1894
 Eumolpus Weber, 1801
 Eupales Lefèvre, 1885
 Eupetale Flowers, 2021
 Euphrytus Jacoby, 1881
 Eurydemus Chapuis, 1874
 Euryope Dalman, 1824
 Eurypelta Lefèvre, 1885
 Eurysarcus Lefèvre, 1885
 Eurysthenes Lefèvre, 1885
 Exochognathus Blake, 1946

F

 Falsoiphimoides Pic, 1935
 Ferreirana Bechyné, 1958
 Fidia Motschulsky, 1861 (= Lypesthes Baly, 1863)
 Fractipes Bechyné, 1950
 Frenais Jacoby, 1903
 Freudeita Bechyné, 1950
 Freycolaspis Scherer, 1964

G

 Gaberella Selman, 1965
 Geloptera Baly, 1861
 Glyptoscelis Chevrolat in Dejean, 1836
 Glyptosceloides Askevold & Flowers, 1994
 Goniopleura Westwood, 1832
 Graphops LeConte, 1884
 Gressittana Medvedev, 2009
 Gressittella Medvedev, 2009
 Guyanica Chevrolat in Dejean, 1836

H

 Habrophora Erichson, 1847
 Hemigymna Weise, 1923
 Heminodes Jacoby, 1895
 Hemiplatys Baly, 1863
 Hemydacne Jacoby, 1897
 Hemyloticus Jacoby, 1892
 Hermesia Lefèvre, 1877
 Hermesilla Bechyné, 1954
 Heterotrichus Chapuis, 1874
 Hornibius Fairmaire, 1888
 Hylax Lefèvre, 1884
 Hyperaxis Harold, 1874
 Hypoderes Lefèvre, 1877

I

 Iphimeis Baly, 1864
 Iphimoides Jacoby, 1883
 Iphimolpus Bechyné, 1949
 Irenes Chapuis, 1874
 Ischyrolampra Lefèvre, 1885
 Ischyrolamprina Bechyné, 1950
 Isolepronota Bechyné, 1949
 Itatiaya Bechyné, 1953
 Iviva Gressitt, 1969
 Ivongionymus Bechyné, 1946
 Ivongius Harold, 1877

J

 Jansonius Baly, 1878

K

 Keeta Maulik, 1931
 Kimberleya Weise, 1916
 Kumatoeides Gómez-Zurita, 2018

L

 Labasa Bryant, 1925
 Lahejia Gahan, 1896
 Lamprosphaerus Baly, 1859
 Lebisiella Bechyné, 1947
 Ledesmodina Bechyné, 1951
 Lefevrea Jacoby, 1897
 Lepidocolaspis Lea, 1915
 Lepina Baly, 1863 (= Demotinella Jacoby, 1908)
 Lepinaria Medvedev, 1998
 Leprocolaspis Bechyné, 1951
 Lepronida Baly, 1864
 Lepronota Chapuis, 1874
 Leprotoides Jacoby, 1896
 Lindinia Lefèvre, 1893
 Llanomolpus Bechyné, 1997
 Lobispa Staines, 2001
 Longeumolpus Špringlová, 1960
 Lophea Baly, 1865
 Louisdesartsia Bechyné, 1955
 Lucignolo Zoia, 2010
 Lymidus Fairmaire, 1901
 Lyraletes Bechyné, 1952

M

 Macetes Chapuis, 1874
 Macrocoma Chapuis, 1874
 Mahakirya Bechyné, 1949
 Mahatsinjoa Bechyné, 1964
 Majungaeus Bechyné, 1949
 Malayocorynus Medvedev, 2004
 Malegia Lefèvre, 1883
 Mandollia Selman, 1965
 Marajoarinha B. Bechyné, 1983
 Mariamela Monrós, 1951
 Massiea Lefèvre, 1893
 Mecistes Chapuis, 1874
 Medvedemolpus Moseyko, 2010
 Megalocolaspoides Medvedev, 2005
 Megascelis Latreille, 1825
 Megasceloides Jacoby, 1898
 Melindea Lefèvre, 1884
 Melinodea Jacoby, 1900
 Meniellus Weise, 1903
 Menioporus Duvivier, 1891
 Menius Chapuis, 1874
 Meroda Baly, 1860
 Mesocolaspis Jacoby, 1908
 Metachroma Chevrolat in Dejean, 1836
 Metacolaspis Horn, 1895
 Metaparia Crotch, 1873
 Metaxyonycha Chevrolat in Dejean, 1836
 Microaletes Bechyné, 1954
 Microeurydemus Pic, 1938
 Microhermesia Jacoby, 1900
 Micromolpus Gressitt, 1969
 Microsyagrus Pic, 1952
 Mireditha Reitter, 1913
 Monardiella Pic, 1940
 Monrosiella Bechyné, 1945
 Montrouzierella Jolivet, Verma & Mille, 2007
 Mouhotina Lefèvre, 1885
 Murimolpus Bechyné, 1950
 Myochrous Erichson, 1847

N

 Nakanaia Gressitt, 1969
 Neculla Baly, 1863
 Neochalcoplacis Bechyné, 1950
 Neocles Chapuis, 1874
 Neocloides Jacoby, 1898
 Neofidia Strother, 2020 (= Fidia Baly, 1863)
 Neoiphimeis Bechyné, 1954
 Neovianaeta Bechyné, 1954
 Nephrella Baly, 1863
 Nerissella Jacoby, 1904
 Nerissidius Weise, 1895
 Nerissus Chapuis, 1874
 Nodina Motschulsky, 1858
 Nodocolaspis Bechyné, 1949
 Nodonotopsis Bechyné, 1949
 Nodostella Jacoby, 1908
 Nodostonopa Jacoby, 1901
 Noriaia Bechyné, 1954
 Nossioecus Harold, 1877
 Notoxolepra Medvedev, 2004
 Nycterodina Bechyné, 1951

O

 Obelistes Lefèvre, 1885
 Ocnida Lefèvre, 1885
 Odontiomorpha Jacoby, 1900
 Odontionopa Chevrolat in Dejean, 1836
 Olorus Chapuis, 1874
 Orthaulexis Gressitt, 1945
 Osnaparis Fairmaire, 1889
 Otilea Lefèvre, 1877

P

 Pachnephoptrus Reitter, 1892
 Pachnephorus Chevrolat in Dejean, 1836
 Pagellia Lefèvre, 1885
 Pagriella Medvedev, 1993
 Pagria Lefèvre, 1884
 †Paleomolpus Nadein, 2015
 Pallena Chapuis, 1874
 Paracrothinium Chen, 1940
 Parademotina Bryant & Gressitt, 1957
 Paraivongius Pic, 1936
 Parascela Baly, 1878
 Parheminodes Chen, 1940
 Paria LeConte, 1858
 Parnops Jacobson, 1894
 Pathius Aslam, 1968
 Pausiris Chapuis, 1874
 Peniticus Sharp, 1876
 Percolaspis Bechyné, 1957
 Periparia Bechyné, 1951
 Phaedroides Lefèvre, 1885
 Phainodina Gressitt, 1969
 Phanaeta Lefèvre, 1878
 Phascus Lefèvre, 1884
 Pheloticus Harold, 1877
 Philippimolpus Monrós, 1952
 Phortus Weise, 1899
 Phytoparia Bechyné, 1957
 Phytorellus Medvedev & Moseyko, 2003
 Phytorus Jacoby, 1884
 Pilacolaspis Sharp, 1886
 Piomera Baly, 1863
 Plastonothus Lefèvre, 1884
 Platycornia Zoia, 2018
 Platycorynus Chevrolat in Dejean, 1836
 Plaumannita Bechyné, 1954
 Podocolaspis Bechyné, 1953
 Podoxenus Lefèvre, 1877
 Prionodera Chevrolat in Dejean, 1836
 Prionoderita Flowers, 2004
 †Profidia Gressitt, 1963
 Proliniscus Selman, 1965
 Promecosoma Lefèvre, 1877
 Prypnocolaspis Lea, 1915
 Psathyrocerus Blanchard, 1851
 Pseudabirus Fairmaire, 1897
 Pseudaoria Jacoby, 1908
 Pseudedusia Jacoby, 1898
 Pseudivongius Jacoby, 1897
 Pseudochoris Jacoby, 1890
 Pseudocolaspis Laporte, 1833
 Pseudocolaspoides Medvedev, 2005
 Pseudolepis Medvedev & Zoia, 2001
 Pseudolpus Jacoby, 1884
 Pseudometaxis Jacoby, 1900
 Pseudostola Fairmaire, 1899
 Pseudostonopa Jacoby, 1903
 Pseudosyagrus Fairmaire, 1886
 Pseudoxanthus Zoia, 2010
 Pubicolaspis Bechyné, 1954
 Pygocolaspis Bechyné, 1950
 Pygomolpus Bechyné, 1949
 Pyropida Baly, 1862

R

 Rhabdocolaspis Bechyné, 1953
 Rhabdopterus Lefèvre, 1885
 Rhembastichus Weise, 1908
 Rhembastus Harold, 1877
 Rhembivongius Bechyné, 1964
 Rhinobolus Blackburn, 1890
 Rhodopaea Gruev & Tomov, 1968
 Rhynchomolpus Gressitt, 1969
 Rhyparida Baly, 1861
 Rhyparidella Gressitt, 1969
 Rhyparidula Weise, 1910
 Rosiroia Bechyné, 1950
 Ruffoita Bechyné, 1950

S

 Sahantaha Bechyné, 1947
 Samuelsonia Jolivet, Verma & Mille, 2007
 Sandrananta Bechyné, 1964
 Sarum Selman, 1965
 Scelodonta Westwood, 1838
 Scelodontina Medvedev, 1979
 Scelolanka Medvedev, 1974
 Schizonoda Bechyné, 1950
 Scotosus Fairmaire, 1901
 Sedlacekia Gressitt, 1969
 Selmania Zoia, 2019 (= Massartia Selman, 1965)
 Semmiona Fairmaire, 1885
 Sibotes Lefèvre, 1885
 Sphaeropis Lefèvre, 1876
 Sphaerostola Fairmaire, 1903
 Spintherophyta Dejean, 1836
 Stasimus Baly, 1863
 Stereonoda Bechyné, 1951
 Sterneurus Lefèvre, 1875
 Sternocolaspis Bechyné, 1950
 Stethotes Baly, 1867
 Stizomolpus Gressitt, 1969
 Stygnobia Weise, 1922
 Stylomolpus Bechyné, 1953
 Susteraia Bechyné, 1950
 Syagrus Chapuis, 1874
 Sybriacosoma Jacoby, 1895
 Sybriacus Harold, 1877
 Syricta Baly, 1865

T

 Taimbezinhia Bechyné, 1954
 Talurus Lefèvre, 1889
 Tanybria Selman, 1963
 Taophila Heller, 1916
 †Taphioporus Moseyko & Kirejtshuk, 2013
 Tectaletes Bechyné, 1953
 Terillus Chapuis, 1874
 Thasycles Chapuis, 1874
 Theocolaspis Bechyné, 1953
 Therses Jacoby, 1890
 Thootes Jacoby, 1890
 Thyra Lefèvre, 1875
 Thyrasia Jacoby, 1884
 Thysanomeros Flowers, 2003
 Thysbina Weise, 1902
 Tijucana Bechyné, 1957
 Timentes Selman, 1965
 Tomecolaspis Weise, 1923
 Tricliona Lefèvre, 1885
 Tricliophora Jacoby, 1904
 Trichochalcea Baly, 1878
 Trichochrysea Baly, 1861
 Trichocolaspis Medvedev, 2005
 Tricholapita Gómez-Zurita & Cardoso, 2020
 Trichospinthera Bechyné & Bechyné, 1976
 Trichostola Chapuis, 1874
 Trichotheca Baly, 1860
 Trichoxantha Medvedev, 1992
 Trypocolaspis Lea, 1915
 Tymnes Chapuis, 1874
 Typophorus Chevrolat in Dejean, 1836
 Tyrannomolpus Nadein & Leschen, 2017

U

 Uhehlia Weise, 1906

V

 Vadoniella Bechyné, 1947
 Vianaeta Bechyné, 1949
 Vieteumolpus Medvedev, 2004
 Vinsoneumolpus Bechyné, 1957
 Vitibia Fairmaire, 1882

W

 Weiselina Reitter, 1913
 Wittmerita Bechyné, 1950

X

 Xanthonia Baly, 1863
 Xanthopachys Baly, 1864
 Xanthophorus Jacoby, 1908

Z

 Zavadilia Bechyné, 1946
 Zenocolaspis Bechyné, 1997
 Zohrana Aslam, 1968

Other
Genera formerly placed in Eumolpinae, but are now placed in other subfamilies:
 Platycolaspis Jacoby, 1908 (now in Cryptocephalinae)

Notes

References

Eumolpinae